Anolis shrevei, the Cordillera central stout anole or Shreve's anole, is a species of lizard in the family Dactyloidae. The species is found in the Dominican Republic.

References

Anoles
Reptiles described in 1939
Endemic fauna of the Dominican Republic
Reptiles of the Dominican Republic
Taxa named by Doris Mable Cochran